Farnesina may refer to:

Architecture 
 Casa della Farnesina, an historic building of the ancient Rome, in the neighborhood of Trastevere, Rome
 Palazzo della Farnesina, the headquarters of Ministry of Foreign Affairs of the government of the Republic of Italy
 Villa Farnesina, a Renaissance suburban villa in the neighborhood of Trastevere, Rome

Art collections 
 The Farnesina Experimenta Art Collection, a contemporary Italian art collection exhibited at the Palazzo della Farnesina, Rome, Italy
 The Collezione Farnesina, a 20th-century Italian art collection exhibited at the Palazzo della Farnesina, Rome, Italy

Places 
 Farnesina (district of Rome) a district of Rome, Italy

Institutions 
 The Ministry of Foreign Affairs (Italy), also known as the Farnesina, as a metonym from its headquarters, the Palazzo della Farnesina in Rome